Looma is a hamlet in central Alberta, Canada within Leduc County.

Demographics 

See also 
List of communities in Alberta
List of hamlets in Alberta

References 

Designated places in Alberta
Hamlets in Alberta
Leduc County